Beroy Sud is a town and commune in southwestern Madagascar. It belongs to the district of Ampanihy, which is a part of Atsimo-Andrefana Region. The population of the commune was estimated to be approximately 15,000 in 2001 commune census.

Only primary schooling is available. The majority 80% of the population of the commune are farmers, while an additional 2% receives their livelihood from raising livestock. The most important crop is peanuts, while other important products are cassava and rice.  Services provide employment for 18% of the population.

References and notes 

Populated places in Atsimo-Andrefana